Rock of Ages... Hymns and Faith is the sixteenth studio album by Christian  and pop singer Amy Grant. It is the follow-up to her 2002 release Legacy... Hymns and Faith. Rock of Ages is Amy Grant's 11th Christian chart-topping album.

Track listing
"Anywhere With Jesus" (Pounds, Towner) – 3:10
"Carry You" (Grant) – 3:00
"Sweet Will of God" (Morris) – 3:44
"Joyful, Joyful, We Adore Thee" (Beethoven, Dyke) – 3:23
"Jesus Loves Me/They'll Know We Are Christians/Helping Hand" (Bradbury, Darnall, Grant, McGuire, Scholtes, Sims, Warner) – 4:43
"Rock of Ages (Duet with Vince Gill)" (Hastings, Toplady) – 3:39
"O Master, Let Me Walk With Thee" (Gladden, Smith) – 2:46
"Abide With Me" (Lyte, Monk) – 4:47
"God Moves in a Mysterious Way/The Lord Is in His Holy Temple" (Bible, Kirkpatrick, Psalter) – 2:06
"Turn Your Eyes Upon Jesus" (Lemmel) – 3:08
"El Shaddai" (Card, Thompson) – 4:06
"I Surrender All" (Venter, Weeden) – 2:37
"O Love That Will Not Let Me Go" (Matheson, Peace) – 4:10

Personnel 
 Amy Grant – lead vocals
 John Jarvis – Wurlitzer electric piano (1), acoustic piano (2–8, 11, 12, 13), keyboards (8)
 John Hobbs – Hammond B3 organ (1, 3, 6, 8, 12, 13), Rhodes (2, 8), synthesizer (2), electric piano (4), acoustic piano solo (4), keyboards (5, 11), acoustic piano (9)
 Richard Bennett – archtop guitar (1), electric guitar (2, 3, 5, 6, 8, 11, 13), cavaquinho (4, 7, 10), 12-string electric guitar (12)
 Vince Gill – acoustic guitar (1–5, 11, 12), electric guitar solo (1, 2, 5, 8), backing vocals (1, 2, 3, 5, 7, 8, 10, 11, 12), mandolin (4, 12), lead vocals (6), archtop guitar (10), acoustic guitar solo (11), octave mandolin (12)
 Dean Parks – slide guitar (1), electric guitar (2–8, 11, 12, 13)
 Willie Weeks – bass (1–8, 11, 12, 13), upright bass (10)
 Chad Cromwell – drums (1–8, 11, 12, 13)
 Eric Darken – percussion (7), tambourine (8), conga (8)
 Stuart Duncan – fiddle (4), banjo (5)
 Sam Levine – penny whistle (7)
 John Catchings – cello (9)
 Jim Horn – saxophone (13), horn arrangements (13)
 Harvey Thompson – saxophone (13)
 Charlie Rose – trombone (13)
 Quinton Ware – trumpet (13)
 Bekka Bramlett – backing vocals (1, 5)
 Billy Thomas – backing vocals (1)
 Kim Keyes – backIng vocals (1)
 Jenny Gill – backing vocals (2, 7, 12)
 Andrea Zonn – backing vocals (3), violin (9), viola (9)
 The Brazos River Mountain Boys – backing vocals (4)
 Michael McDonald – backing vocals (5)
 The Fairfield Four (Robert Hamlett, Isaac Freeman, Wilson Waters Jr. and James Fizer) – backing vocals (6)
 The Brazos River Choir – backing vocals (9)
 Kathy Grant Harrell – backing vocals (10)
 Mimi Grant Verner – backing vocals (10)
 Carol Grant Nuismer – backing vocals (10)
 Gloria Grant – backing vocals (10)
 Burton Grant – backing vocals and recitation (10)

Production 
 Brown Bannister – producer
 Vince Gill – producer
 Steve Bishir – recording, mixing
 Brian Grabin – recording assistant
 Oceanway Studios (Nashville, Tennessee) – recording location
 Oxford Sound (Nashville, Tennessee) – overdub recording location, mixed location
 Steve Hall – mastering at Future Disc Systems (North Hollywood, California)
 Traci Sterling Bishir – production manager for Sterling Production Management
 Burton Brooks – A&R administration
 Katherine Petillo – art direction
 Sally Carns Gulde – design
 Blair Berle – senior creative administrator
 Andrew Southam – photographer
 Rob Talty – hair stylist for Luxe
 Jamie Taylor – make-up for Solo Artists
 David Kaufman – wardrobe

Charts
Album – Billboard (North America)

Awards
Grammy Awards

GMA Dove Awards

 The Dove Award for Inspirational Album of the Year was in a tie with Bart Millard's Hymned, No. 1.

References

Amy Grant albums
2005 albums
Albums produced by Brown Bannister
Sequel albums
Word Records albums